The Ares was a proposed intercontinental ballistic missile (ICBM) derived from the Titan II missile. It was a single-stage rocket with a high-performance engine to increase the rocket's specific impulse. Both Aerojet and Rocketdyne carried out engine design studies for the project, but Ares was ultimately cancelled in favour of solid-fuel ICBMs, which were safer to store and could be launched with much less notice. The Ares missile series was canceled due to the inconvenience of using liquid fuel. Some reasons included extensive protection from corrosion  within the silos, as well as the liquid fuel propellant, ideally used in the proposed Ares missiles, being more expensive to maintain. Thus making the transition to use the Minuteman II missiles, that ran on solid fuel, easier because solid fuel was more reliable for sand was less expensive than previous projects.  Hence the cancellation of the Ares missile series.

Ares would also have been capable of placing a 4,000 kg payload into low Earth orbit as a single-stage to orbit launch vehicle.

•http://www.u-s-history.com/pages/h1955.html

Abandoned military rocket and missile projects of the United States
Intercontinental ballistic missiles of the United States
Titan (rocket family)
Single-stage-to-orbit